Kwak Chang-Hee (born July 26, 1987) is a former South Korean football player.

On 17 June 2011, his football career was rescinded by the Korea Professional Football League with other accomplices.

References

External links
 Player Profile at K-League Official Website 

1987 births
Living people
Association football forwards
South Korean footballers
Daejeon Hana Citizen FC players
K League 1 players
Sportspeople from Gwangju
Sportspeople banned for life